Och du tände stjärnorna is a 1994 Thorleifs album. The album peaked at number 45 on Swedish Albums Chart.

Track listing
"Du gav mig kärlek"
"Innan natten blir till dag"
"Och du tände stjärnorna"
"Det sa bom bom i mitt hjärta"
"Jag var så kär"
"Får du tårar på din kind"
"Vinternatt"
"The Young Ones"
"Fem röda rosor till dej"
"Måne"
"En gyllene ring"
"Du sa farväl"
"Vi tror på lyckan"
"Swing it, magistern!" (medley)
"Puff, the Magic Dragon"
"Så länge hjärtat slår"
"När natten blir till dag"

Charts

References 

1994 albums
Thorleifs albums
Swedish-language albums